Valery Petrovich Zazdravnykh (born 8 July 1963) is a Russian professional football coach and a former player. He is the manager of SKA Rostov-on-Don.

Club career
As a player, he made his debut in the Soviet First League in 1981 for FC Dynamo Stavropol.

References

1963 births
People from Novoalexandrovsk
Sportspeople from Stavropol Krai
Living people
Soviet footballers
Russian footballers
Association football midfielders
FC Dynamo Stavropol players
FC Rotor Volgograd players
CSKA Pamir Dushanbe players
FC Tekstilshchik Kamyshin players
FC Chernomorets Novorossiysk players
FC Lada-Tolyatti players
FC Neftekhimik Nizhnekamsk players
Soviet Top League players
Russian Premier League players
Russian football managers
FC Nistru Otaci managers
FC Dynamo Stavropol managers
FC SKA Rostov-on-Don players